Pine Creek is a rural locality in the Mid North region of South Australia, situated in the Regional Council of Goyder. It was established in August 2000 when boundaries were formalised for the long established local name.

The Hundred of Ketchowla is a cadastral unit of hundred, the boundaries of which are exactly contiguous with the locality of Pine Creek. The hundred was proclaimed by Governor William Jervois on 5 August 1880, named for an Aboriginal name of unknown origin.

Ketchowla Station is named after the hundred and the station's homestead is located within Pine Creek. A post office at Ketchowla opened circa 1872 and closed on 30 November 1917. The Ketchowla Woolshed, Old Homestead and Outbuildings are listed on the South Australian Heritage Register.

The 2016 Australian census which was conducted in August 2016 reports that Pine Creek  had no people living within its boundaries.

Note that there are several creeks in South Australia called Pine Creek, including a tributary that joins the River Wakefield at Undalya and forms part of the boundary between the Hundred of Upper Wakefield and the Hundred of Saddleworth.

See also
Pine Creek (disambiguation)

References

Towns in South Australia
Mid North (South Australia)